Sanchai Ratiwatana and Sonchat Ratiwatana were the defending champions, but they chose to compete in Johannesburg instead.
Santiago González and Vasek Pospisil won in the final 3–6, 6–3, [10–8], against Kaden Hensel and Adam Hubble.

Seeds

Draw

Draw

References
 Doubles Draw

Abierto Internacional del Bicentenario Leon - Doubles
2010 Doubles